Emeraldella is a genus of arthropod known from the Middle Cambrian of North America. The type species E. brocki was described in 1912 from the Burgess Shale. 21 specimens of Emeraldella are known from the Greater Phyllopod bed, where they comprise < 0.1% of the community. A re-study on the species was done in 2012.  A second species E. brutoni is known from the Wheeler Shale, which was described in 2011. An additional specimen of E. brutoni was described in 2019, which revealed more of the anatomy. It has been placed as part of the Artiopoda, a group of arthropods containing trilobites and their relatives.

Description 
Caudal flaps are present on the terminal tergite, alongside an elongated spine.

Emeraldella brocki 
E. brocki is at least 60 mm in length, it possesses 12 tergites in the trunk section, with an extended telson. The attenula are long and can reach the length of the body, and are composed of more than 80 segments. Ocular structures appear to be absent in this species.

Emeraldella brutoni 
E. brutoni is up to 50 mm in length, it possesses 10 trunk tergites, and possesses clear ocellii, unlike E. brocki, the antennae are not preserved well enough to tell true length.

References

External links

 http://www.fossilmuseum.net/Cambrian-Explosion/Emeraldella/Emeraldella.htm

Burgess Shale fossils
Artiopoda
Prehistoric arthropod genera
Cambrian genus extinctions
Wheeler Shale